Corsair is the sixth novel in The Oregon Files by Clive Cussler and Jack Du Brul.

Plot
This book follows the enigmatic Juan Cabrillo and the Corporation team's mission to recover the US Secretary of State Fiona Katamora before an upcoming peace summit, which is being held in Tripoli, Libya. 

They discover that all is not as it seems and that the plane crash that brought her down may not have been an accident. The Corporation must battle terrorists with a foothold in the Libyan government while uncovering the identity of their hidden leader: Suleiman Al-Jama. 

As the journey continues, the team uncovers many hidden secrets in the Libyan desert including the entire ex-foreign department of the government and an archaeologist, Alana Shepard, who is close to uncovering the key to peace in the middle east. 

The Corporation then sets out to find both the lost manuscripts Alana Shepherd was looking for and the Secretary of State.

2009 American novels
Novels by Clive Cussler
Novels by Jack Du Brul
The Oregon Files
G. P. Putnam's Sons books
Collaborative novels